The 2019 EFL Trophy Final was a football match played at Wembley Stadium on 31 March 2019. It decided the winners of the 2018–19 EFL Trophy, the 35th edition of the competition, a knock-out tournament for the 48 teams in League One and League Two and 16 category one academy sides.

The Final was contested by League One sides Portsmouth and Sunderland, of which the winner received £100,000 and the Runners-Up received £50,000. This was the first Trophy final pitting two English football champions against each other in 31 years. It was also the first EFL Trophy Final to be contested by two former Premier League clubs.

The Portsmouth team used Wembley's West changing room, while Sunderland used the East. A coin toss decided that Sunderland had first choice on kit selection. This meant Portsmouth played in blue away socks to avoid clashing with Sunderland's first choice red socks.

Portsmouth won the final after coming from one goal behind with English forward Oliver Hawkins scoring the winning penalty kick in the shootout to hand Portsmouth their first cup trophy since the 2008 FA Cup. Portsmouth centre back, Matthew Clarke, was named man of the match. The game was attended by 85,021 people, making it the highest attended match in the UK and the second highest in Europe that weekend. It set a new attendance record for the Football League Trophy, surpassing the 1988 final.

Route to the final

Portsmouth

Sunderland

Match

References

2019
Events at Wembley Stadium
Trophy Final
Efl Trophy Final 2019
Efl Trophy Final 2019
Efl Trophy Final
Efl Trophy Final
Football League Trophy Final 2019